A list of films produced in Brazil in 1934:

See also
 1934 in Brazil

External links
Brazilian films of 1934 at the Internet Movie Database

Brazil
1934
Films